Beinn na h-Uamha (762 m) is a mountain in the Northwest Highlands of Scotland. It lies in the Ardgour area of Lochaber, west of the village of Corran.

A steep and rugged peak, it provides fantastic views of Loch Linnhe and Sgùrr Dhòmhnuill from its summit.

References

Marilyns of Scotland
Corbetts
Mountains and hills of the Northwest Highlands